, also known as Juvenile Jungle, is a 1956 Japanese Sun Tribe film directed by Kō Nakahira. It is an adaptation of the novel of the same name by Shintaro Ishihara, the older brother of cast member Yujiro Ishihara, and is about two brothers who fall in love with the same woman and the resulting conflict. The film was controversial upon release because of its depiction of Japanese youth. It later was known as a foundational work of the Sun Tribe genre.

Cast 
 Masahiko Tsugawa – Haruji
 Yujiro Ishihara – Natsuhisa
 Mie Kitahara – Eri
 Harold Conway – Eri's husband
 Masumi Okada – Frank
 Shintaro Ishihara – Ishihara

References

External links 
 
 
 
Heat Stroke: Crazed Fruit and Japanese Cinema’s Season in the Sun an essay by Chuck Stephens at the Criterion Collection
Crazed Fruit: Imagining a New Japan—The Taiyozoku Films an essay by Michael Raine at the Criterion Collection

1956 films
1956 drama films
Japanese erotic drama films
Films based on Japanese novels
1950s Japanese-language films
Shintaro Ishihara
Nikkatsu films
Films scored by Masaru Sato
1950s Japanese films
Japanese black-and-white films